Paulinus I was the first Patriarch of Aquileia, serving from 557 to 571.

Background
When he took over the see was in schism with Rome. When the Lombards invaded northern Italy in 568, Paulinus fled Aquileia with his treasures, as had the other Archbishop in schism with Rome, Honoratus of Milan. Paulinus transferred his see to Grado, a small island opposite Aquileia, which was still controlled by the Byzantines, but retained the title of Patriarch of Aquileia. He died soon after arriving in Grado.

References

571 deaths
6th-century Italo-Roman people
6th-century archbishops
Patriarchs of Aquileia
Year of birth unknown